Guy Touvron (born 15 February 1950) is a French classical trumpet player and music teacher. He is an accomplished soloist, having played with some of Europe's leading orchestras, and has premiered several prominent trumpet concertos. Touvron has given over 3,000 concerts, features on over 70 recordings, and has won several prizes, including three international Grands Prix.

Touvron also teaches trumpet and regularly conducts master classes around the world. He has been called "one of the leading pedagogues of trumpet technique and interpretation France has ever produced." He wrote a biography on his mentor Maurice André, which was published in 2003.

Biography 
Guy Touvron was born on 15 February 1950 in Vichy, France. While his parents were not musicians, his grandfather played the cornet. At the age of ten Touvron started playing the cornet, and after a few years he became proficient on both the cornet and trumpet. In 1967 Touvron enrolled at the Paris Conservatory of Music and studied under classical virtuoso trumpeter Maurice André. A year later the Conservatory awarded Touvron first prize for cornet, and a year after that, first prize for trumpet.

Touvron held the position of principal trumpet for the Orchestre National de Lyon between 1969 and 1971, and for the French Radio Philharmonic Orchestra between 1971 and 1974. In 1973 he formed his own group, the Guy Touvron Brass Ensemble, and became a faculty member of the Lyons Conservatory in 1974. In 1990 Touvron began teaching at the Conservatoire National de Région in Paris. He regularly conducts master classes around the world, including at the Juilliard School in New York City, and at the Royal Northern College of Music in Manchester.

Many of Touvron's performances are of works by baroque composers like Bach, Albinoni and Torelli, but he also performs contemporary classical music and has premiered several prominent trumpet concertos by Ivan Jevtić, Jacques Loussier, François Rauber and others. Over 20 compositions have been written for him. Touvron has performed with orchestras such as I Solisti Veneti, the English Chamber Orchestra, La Scala di Milano, The Luzern Festival Strings, the Prague Chamber Orchestra, as well as French Orchestras of Lyon, Toulouse, Pays de Loire, Pays de Savoie and Auvergne. He regularly appears in festivals at Lille, Prades, Lanaudière (Canada), Bachwoche Ansbach, Pollenca (Spain), Stresa (Italy), Salzburg (Austria) and Montreux (Switzerland).

Touvron features on over 70 recordings, has given over 3,000 concerts, and has won several prizes, including three international Grands Prix in Munich, Geneva and Prague. In the early 2000s, Touvron wrote a biography on his mentor Maurice André entitled Maurice André: Une trompette pour la renommée (Maurice André: A Trumpet for Fame), which was published in 2003.

Asteroid 278197 Touvron, discovered by French astronomer Jean-Claude Merlin in 2007, was named in his honor. The official  was published by the Minor Planet Center on 5 January 2015.

Selected discography 
 Guy Touvron with Wolfgang Karius: Splendour & Magnificence: Glory of the Baroque Trumpet (2007)
 Guy Touvron: Trompette – Etudes Françaises du XXè Siècle (2000)
 Guy Touvron and Franck Pulcini: Sonnez Trompettes (1995)
 Guy Touvron and Carine Clement: Le Concert
 Guy Touvron and Luigi Celeghin: Fantasia per tromba e organo (1985)
 Guy Touvron and Nelly Cotin: Pavane
 Guy Touvron and Isabelle Régis: Les plus beaux Noëls de nos Provinces
 Guy Touvron and Nelly Cotin: La Trompette de toutes les Mélodies
 Guy Touvron and Barbara Löcher: Cantate 51 – J.S. Bach / Sur les rives du Tibre – Scarlatti (1990)
 Guy Touvron and Daniel Colin: Trompette au bal musette (2001)
 Guy Touvron, Marie Rigaud, Catherine Ramona and Isabelle Ramona: Capricci armonici (1997)
 Guy Touvron (soloist) with Orchestre A. Vivaldi: Hommage à l'Europe (2001)
 Guy Touvron (soloist) with Prague Chamber Orchestra: Mozart – Touvron
 Guy Touvron (soloist) with Orchestre d'Harmonie de la Garde Républicaine: De List à Nougaro
 Guy Touvron (soloist) with Orchestre d'Harmonie de la ville de Vichy: Orchestre d'Harmonie de la ville de Vichy avec Guy Touvron
 Guy Touvron Brass Ensemble: Ensemble de cuivres Guy Touvron
 Guy Touvron Brass Ensemble: Gershwin (1992)
 Guy Touvron Quintette: Ragtimes (1992)
Source:

Bibliography 
 Guy Touvron: Maurice André: Une trompette pour la renommée (Rocher, 2003) – biography of Maurice André

References 
 

1950 births
Living people
People from Vichy
French classical trumpeters
Male trumpeters
French cornetists
French biographers
20th-century French male writers
20th-century French musicians
Officers of the Ordre national du Mérite
Chevaliers of the Ordre des Arts et des Lettres
French male non-fiction writers
21st-century trumpeters
20th-century French male musicians
21st-century French male musicians